Yin yang fried rice (also transliterated as yuenyeung fried rice or yuanyang fried rice) is a rice dish from Hong Kong, consisting of a plate of rice with béchamel sauce and tomato sauce.

The name "yuenyeung", which refers to mandarin ducks, is a symbol of conjugal love in Chinese culture, as the birds usually appear in pairs and the male and female look very different. This same connotation of a "pair" of two unlike items is used to name this rice. Due to the meaning of love, this dish often appears in the wedding dinner.

See also
 List of rice dishes
 Yuenyeung (drink)

References

Cantonese cuisine
Chinese rice dishes
Fried rice
Hong Kong cuisine